Peter Kennedy may refer to:

  Peter Kennedy (artist) (born 1945), Australian artist, co-founder of artist cooperative Inhibodress in Sydney around 1970
 Peter Kennedy (cricketer) (born 1965), New Zealand cricketer
 Peter Kennedy (economist) (1943–2010), Canadian economist
 Peter Kennedy (diplomat) (born 1949), New Zealand ambassador
 Peter Kennedy (figure skater) (born 1927), American pair skater
 Peter Kennedy (folklorist) (1922–2006), folklorist and folk musician
 Peter Kennedy (folk-rock musician) of The Kennedys
 Peter Kennedy (footballer) (born 1973), Northern Irish footballer
 Peter Kennedy (journalist) (born 1942/43), Australian political journalist
 Peter Kennedy (priest), controversial priest in Australia 
 Peter Kennedy (sailor) (born 1964), Irish Olympic sailor